Light House Media Centre, often simply referred to as Light House, is a cinema, gallery and media hub for Wolverhampton and the surrounding area. Light House is located within the historic former Chubb Locks Factory in the city centre. They describe themselves as:

 "a beacon for the creative industries; source of illumination on all aspects of media; guide and educator to all ages in pursuit of creative media and film knowledge; home to diverse array of film, animation and photography"

Light House is a non-profit making organisation and so is largely funded and supported by both regional and national external media orientated sources. The main supporters of Light House are Arts Council West Midlands, Wolverhampton City Council, UK Film Council, Screen West Midlands, Skillset, Advantage West Midlands, University of Wolverhampton and Europa Cinemas Network. Light House has been supported to develop its media education activity as an Education Hub through Screen WM's Investment Fund with funds from The National Lottery through the UK Film Council.

History 
The formal opening of Light House took place on 16 March 1987 by the Mayor of Wolverhampton, Councillor Bishan Dass, although activities had already taken place since the August 1986, when it was officially founded. Light House was then housed in the same building as Wolverhampton's Central Art Gallery, there were only three members of staff and it was a joint project of Wolverhampton Council and Wolverhampton Polytechnic (now the University of Wolverhampton). The programme guide for that period included, amongst other activities, courses in video production, seasons of science fiction films, an exhibition on India and Independence, marking the 40th anniversary of India's freedom from British rule and a conference about Black filmmaking.

Today, Light House inhabits larger, partly purpose-built accommodation, is an independent company and employs 10 full-time staff and a small team of part-time staff and volunteers. According to their website, they still run production courses, new exhibitions, films, educational activities, conferences and events. In addition, there are two major annual festivals and a number of activities that develop and support the growing creative industries in the city and surrounding area.

Cinema and gallery

Cinema 

Light House houses two screens with a programme of contemporary and retrospective releases, archive films and new independent shorts and features. They also show a number of mainstream feature films, although far fewer, and for much shorter runs than major cinemas. They also host a range of film festivals (the most notable of which is Flip Animation Festival) and film education events. They also hire their screens out for private, educational, charity or fundraising events.

Gallery 

Light House has two main galleries: the main gallery is primarily dedicated to showing and supporting critically engaged documentary photography whereas the balcony gallery tends to showcase work from emerging photographers.

Media hub 
Because of the courses and workshops they offer, Light House refers to itself as a 'media hub' for Wolverhampton and the West Midlands area. These courses and workshops cover subjects such as video production, animation and other forms of multimedia. They also pass on media knowledge through practical workshops, tailored advice, accredited training and bespoke specialist courses, all of which are open to professionals, students or interested members of the public.

Light House also has a commercial production company which has been producing films since 1988. Their portfolio includes short films, documentaries and animated films. They also work with schools to produce films and have recently had a film shown at London Short Film Festival called ‘'Shadow Play'’ which was co-created with Redhill School, Stourbridge.

Lock Works 
Lock Works café bar is aimed as "a family friendly environment away from the hustle and bustle of the city centre".  It also holds small informal exhibitions and has cases available for artists to display work in.

Lock Works also acts as a third, smaller gallery largely used to house smaller or specialist photography exhibitions.

FLIP animation festival 

FLIP is an animation festival that is primarily hosted by Light House. It has attracted a host of high-profile supporters and contributors, including BAFTA; UK Film Council; Toon Boom; Digital Arts Magazine; Channel 4; West Midlands Animation Forum, BBC Big Screen and Stop Motion Pro.

Deaffest film festival 

Deaffest is the UK's only deaf-led film and television festival, which celebrates the talents of deaf filmmakers and media artists from all over the world.

External links
Light House Media Centre's website
Flip Festival’s website
Deaffest’s website
Deaffest’s photos

Notes 

Wolverhampton
Mass media in Wolverhampton
Companies based in Wolverhampton
Tourist attractions in Wolverhampton